Stuck in the Middle may refer to:

 "Stuck in the Middle with You", a 1972 song by Stealers Wheel
 "Stuck in the Middle" (Clea song), a 2004 song by girl band Clea
 Stuck in the Middle: 17 Comics from an Unpleasant Age, a 2007 anthology of comic tales edited by artist Ariel Schrag
 Stuck in the Middle (TV series), a Disney Channel series starring Jenna Ortega
 "Stuck in the Middle", a 2009 song by Jay Sean from his album All or Nothing
 "Stuck in the Middle", a 2012 song by Boys Like Girls from the album Crazy World